The Standards and Privileges Committee is a former committee of the United Kingdom House of Commons that existed from 1995 to 2013. The committee was established in 1995 to replace the earlier Committee of Privileges. It consisted of 10 Members of Parliament that sat to make recommendations to the House on complaints of breach of parliamentary privilege. It was itself replaced in January 2013, when it was split into the Committee on Standards and the Committee of Privileges, in order to allow the Committee of Standards to employ lay members.

The committee was appointed by the House of Commons to oversee the work of the Parliamentary Commissioner for Standards. It examined the arrangements for the compilation, maintenance and accessibility of the Register of Members' Interests and considered specific complaints made in relation to the registering or declaring of interests and any matter relating to the conduct of Members, including specific complaints in relation to alleged breaches in the Code of Conduct which were drawn to the committee's attention by the commissioner.

References

External links
 Records for this Committee are held at the Parliamentary Archives

Westminster system
Standards and Privileges
Ethics organizations
Political funding in the United Kingdom